Yang Zhixue (born January 29, 1987 in Qiqihar) is a Chinese former competitive figure skater. He competed in the final segment at two ISU Championships, placing 19th at the 2004 World Junior Championships and 11th at the 2007 Four Continents Championships. He was coached by Fu Caishu in Harbin, China.

Programs

Competitive highlights
JGP: Junior Grand Prix

References

External links
 

Chinese male single skaters
Living people
1987 births
Sportspeople from Qiqihar
Figure skaters from Heilongjiang